Anatoly Zubkov (1900–1967) was a Soviet physiologist, D.Sc. He held the chair of physiology in the Kishinev Medical Institute. Prof. Anatoly Zubkov had published over sixty works on the various problems of the physiology and pathology of the heart and the nervous and endocrine control of functions. He was the first to translate classic works by Ivan Sechenov into English.

Publications

Bibliography 
 

Soviet physiologists
Moscow State University alumni
Academic staff of Perm State University
Academic staff of Moscow State University
Physicians from Chișinău
1900 births
1967 deaths